Wajahat Attre (1945 – 26 May 2017) was a Pakistani music director who composed around 3000 songs for over 200 films.

Early life 
Wajahat Attre was born in Puna, Gujarat, British India in 1945. After the independence of Pakistan in 1947, his family migrated to Pakistan. His father, Rasheed Attre (1919 – 1967) also was a noted film music composer of Pakistan and originally belonged to Amritsar, Punjab, British India.

Career
Wajahat composed music for over 200 films, among them Mukhra (1988 film), Chan Varyam (1981), Naukar Wohti Da (1974 film) and Ishq Khuda (2013 film) became musical hits. He churned out popular songs like Wagdi Nadi Da Paani, Vay Ik Tera Pyar Menu Mileya, Aanda Teray Layi Reshmi Rumal. He worked with singers like Noor Jehan, Humaira Channa, Saira Nasim, Shabnam Majeed and Azra Jehan. 

Wajahat Attre used to be his father's chief assistant for many years before his father's death on 18 December, 1967. So he took up the same profession as his father and eventually became one of the most sought after film music composers in Pakistan in the 1970s and 1980s.

Popular songs

 Films: Mukhra (1988 film), Chan Varyam (1981), Ishq Khuda (2013 film)

Awards
 Wajahat Attre won a total of 9 Nigar Awards as Best Music Director in 1974, 1976, 1977, 1980, 1981, 1983, 1988, 1990 and in 1997.

Death
Attre passed away on 26 May 2017 at the age of 72. He was suffering from heart disease. He was laid to rest at Miani Sahib Graveyard in Lahore, Pakistan.

References

External links

1945 births
2017 deaths
Pakistani film score composers
Pakistani musicians
Musicians from Lahore
Nigar Award winners